Rugi is a small village in Mudhol, district Bagalkot, Karnataka, India. Its population in the 2011 census was 2,467.

References

Villages in Bagalkot district